A total solar eclipse occurred on January 1, 1889. A solar eclipse occurs when the Moon passes between Earth and the Sun, thereby totally or partly obscuring the image of the Sun for a viewer on Earth. A total solar eclipse occurs when the Moon's apparent diameter is larger than the Sun's, blocking all direct sunlight, turning day into darkness. Totality occurs in a narrow path across Earth's surface, with the partial solar eclipse visible over a surrounding region thousands of kilometres wide.
It was visible across western United States, and central Canada. Partiality was visible across the northern Pacific ocean including Hawaii, and all of the United States.

Observations and predictions 

A drawing of map of path across the western United States and central Canada

Additionally this event was witnessed by the prophet Wovoka (1856-1932) who created and preached the second ghost dance movement.

Related eclipses

Saros 120

Notes

Wovoka the Paiute prophet received visions during the solar eclipse of January, 1889. These visions were framework for the Pan-Indian religious movement known as the Ghost Dance.

References

 NASA chart graphics
 Googlemap
 NASA Besselian elements
 Photo of Solar Corona January 1, 1889
 
 Eclipse of June 1, 1889. Contact print from the original glass negative. Lick Observatory Plate Archive, Mt. Hamilton. [January 1, 1889?!]
 On the solar eclipse of January 1, 1889 Holden, E. S., Journal: The Observatory, Vol. 12, p. 130–134 (1889)
 The Total Solar Eclipse of January 1 Nature 39, 487–488 (21 March 1889)
 C.E. Watkins photo / eclipse / lick observatory 1889?, The J. Paul Getty Museum, Object Number: 88.XM.92.83

1889 01 01
1889 in science
1889 01 01
January 1889 events